Golden Mine is a historic home located at Milford, Kent County, Delaware.  The house was built about 1763, and is a two-story, three bay frame dwelling sheathed in cypress shingles. It has a double entrance. There is a two-story, one bay, brick addition with another front entrance.  Both sections share a steep gable roof.  There are rear frame additions. The interior features a large fireplace, winding stairs to the second floor, and front and
rear doors, separated by a single board partition.

It was listed on the National Register of Historic Places in 1978.

References

Houses on the National Register of Historic Places in Delaware
Houses completed in 1763
Houses in Kent County, Delaware
Milford, Delaware
National Register of Historic Places in Kent County, Delaware